Nicola Di Francia (born 24 September 1985 in L'Aquila) is an Italian football defender who most recently played for L'Aquila. He previously played in Serie C2 for Rieti.

References

External links
 

1985 births
Living people
People from L'Aquila
Italian footballers
L'Aquila Calcio 1927 players
Lupa Roma F.C. players
Association football defenders
Footballers from Abruzzo
Sportspeople from the Province of L'Aquila